Pseudomyrmex spinicola is a species of red myrmecophyte-inhabiting neotropical ants which are found only in Nicaragua and Costa Rica. They live in the thorns of tropical trees like Acacia collinsii or Acacia allenii, feeding on nectaries along with the protein and lipid-rich beltian bodies. These bodies are named for Thomas Belt, a naturalist who first described the interactions between acacias and ants in his 1874 book Naturalist in Nicaragua. Belt's book in fact described ants of this species, then unknown.

P. spinicola are the more aggressive among a number of A. collinsii-inhabiting species that engage in a classic case of mutualism. The ants receive colony space in A. collinsii to support their population structure. In return, the ants actively defend the tree from herbivory and often from competing plants nearby, clearing the forest floor of other seedlings. Sometimes, a large P. spinicola colony may be spread between two or more trees, protecting each tree within their colony and possibly grooming A. collinsii seedlings within that microhabitat to be used by the colony.

Populations of mutualistic myrmecophyte-inhabiting ants may be space limited, and therefore P. spinicola use the largest-volume thorns for the queen's chamber and other large-volume thorns for egg nurseries. The smallest eggs will be found in the queen's chamber, before being redistributed to other larger thorns to be nursed through early life stages.

References

External links

Insects described in 1890
Pseudomyrmecinae
Hymenoptera of North America